Cédric Kisamba (born January 25, 1985, Kinshasa, DR Congo) is a Congolese-France footballer currently under contract for French side Les Herbiers VF.

External links
 
 

1985 births
Living people
Democratic Republic of the Congo footballers
French footballers
AJ Auxerre players
LB Châteauroux players
Stade Lavallois players
AS Beauvais Oise players
Najran SC players
Cultural Leonesa footballers
Ligue 2 players
Saudi Professional League players
Segunda División B players
Championnat National players
Championnat National 2 players
Championnat National 3 players
Association football midfielders
France youth international footballers
Expatriate footballers in Saudi Arabia
Expatriate footballers in Spain
Footballers from Kinshasa
21st-century Democratic Republic of the Congo people